Basta is a village in Ma'an Governorate, southern Jordan. , it had a population of 1,491 people, compared to 461 in the 1961 census.

The village gives its name to a nearby archaeological site, the ruins of a prehistoric settlement dating to around 7000 BCE and one of earliest known places in the world that had a settled population who practised agriculture.

References

Populated places in Ma'an Governorate